Unparalleled Universe is the seventh studio album by American technical death metal band Origin. The album was first announced in May of 2017, with a release date a month after.

Critical reception

Olivier Badin of Metal Hammer praised the album as a " technical and brutal death metal tour de force", but criticized the second half of the track Unequivocal for "being basically just anoutro more than anything else." Greg Pratt of Brave Words & Bloody Knuckles spoke highly of the album for its energy. In particular, he praised the album's opening track Infinitesimal to the Infinite for having "an absurd amount of zest and passion, and swirling tech-death riffs to die for."

Track listing

Personnel 
 Origin
Paul Ryan - guitars, backing vocals
Jason Keyser - lead vocals 
Mike Flores - bass, backing vocals
John Longstreth - drums

 Production
Filip Ivanovic - artwork
Colin Marston - mixing, mastering
Robert Rebeck - producer, engineering, recording, mixing

References 

2017 albums
Origin (band) albums
Nuclear Blast albums